Jonathan “Johnny” Rowe may refer to:

 Johnny Rowe (footballer) (born 1907), English football right-back
  (1946–2011), American journalist; see Point Reyes Light (newspaper)
 Jonathan Rowe (footballer) (born 2003), English football winger
 Johnny Rowe, a member of the Canadian band Tin Star Orphans

See also
John Rowe (disambiguation)